Casey O. Anderson was the winner of a special election to the Utah State Senate on May 7, 2011. He ran for a full term in 2012 but was defeated in the Republican primary by Evan J. Vickers, 63-37%.

External links 
 Official campaign web site

Year of birth missing (living people)
Republican Party Utah state senators
Living people
People from Cedar City, Utah
Place of birth missing (living people)